Ricky Charles (born 16 June 1975) is a Grenadian retired footballer who played as a midfielder. He played for the Grenada national football team and is his nation's top scorer with 37 goals.

Club career
Charles played university soccer at Bryant & Stratton College and the University of South Carolina - Spartanburg, and was inducted into the National Junior College Athletic Association Hall of Fame. He then played for the New Hampshire Phantoms and Brooklyn Knights, before playing for St. Ann's Rangers in the TT Pro League.

He had a trial with Football League First Division side West Bromwich Albion in 1996 but was not offered a contract.

International career
Charles scored one goal at the 1995 Caribbean Cup, four goals at the 2001 Caribbean Nations Cup and two goals at the 2005 Caribbean Cup, He has also scored eight goals in twelve qualifying matches for various FIFA World Cups.

International goals

References

External links
 
 Ricky Charles - International Goals

1975 births
Living people
Grenadian footballers
Grenadian expatriate footballers
Grenada international footballers
Seacoast United Phantoms players
Grenadian expatriate sportspeople in Trinidad and Tobago
Brooklyn Knights players
Expatriate footballers in Trinidad and Tobago
Expatriate soccer players in the United States
USL League Two players
2009 CONCACAF Gold Cup players
2011 CONCACAF Gold Cup players
TT Pro League players
Association football midfielders
USC Upstate Spartans men's soccer players
Bryant and Stratton College alumni